The 2011 Big East women's basketball tournament took place in March 2011 at the XL Center in Hartford, Connecticut. The winner will receive the Big East Conference's automatic bid to the 2011 NCAA tournament. This was the second consecutive year Big East tournament to include all 16 of the conference's teams. The teams finishing 9 through 16 in the regular season standings played first-round games, while teams 5 through 8 received byes to the second round. The top 4 teams during the regular season received double-byes to the quarterfinals.

During the tournament, the top-ranked Connecticut beat Notre Dame 73–64 to win their 17th title.

Final regular season standings

‡ Regular season Big East champion

Bracket

OT - Denotes Overtime Game

References

Big East women's basketball tournament
 Tournament